Bentley's paradox (named after Richard Bentley) is a cosmological paradox pointing to a problem occurring when Newton's theory of gravitation is applied to cosmology. Namely, if all the stars are drawn to each other by gravitation, they should collapse into a single point.

In 1687, Isaac Newton published the Principia which contained his universal law of gravitational attraction. Five years later, Richard Bentley, a young churchman and scholar who was preparing a lecture about Newton's theories and the rejection of atheism, wrote a letter to Newton: in a finite universe, if all stars attract each other, would they not collapse into a point? And in an infinite universe with infinitely many stars, would not every star be pulled apart by infinite forces acting in all directions? In his reply, Newton agreed with the first point and favored an infinite universe with infinitely many stars, so that each star would be drawn in all directions equally, the forces would cancel and no collapse would occur. Newton acknowledged the problem that the stars would have to be precisely placed to maintain such an unstable equilibrium without collapse, and later claimed that God prevented the collapse by making "constant minute corrections"; "a continual miracle is needed to prevent the Sun and the fixt stars from rushing together through gravity." 

Both Newton and Bentley thought that the stars did not move and did not consider stars in motion. A finite number of mutually attracting stars in motion can indeed avoid collapse. 

Today it is known that an infinite universe uniformly filled with gravitating matter cannot be analyzed using Newtonian mechanics, as the resulting force at each point in each direction would indeed be infinite. The general theory of relativity can deal with this problem.

Though Newton's explanation was rather unsatisfactory from a cosmological aspect, Bentley's paradox could prove to be the reason behind the "Big Crunch", the opposite phenomenon of the "Big Bang".

References and notes 

Physical cosmology
Gravity
Paradoxes